Supas Tiprod (born 4 October 1962) is a Thai sprinter. He competed in the men's 4 × 100 metres relay at the 1988 Summer Olympics.

References

1962 births
Living people
Athletes (track and field) at the 1988 Summer Olympics
Supas Tiprod
Supas Tiprod
Place of birth missing (living people)